U.S. Music may refer to:

Music of the United States
U.S. Music Corporation